FC Lokomotiv Dzhalal-Abad is a Kyrgyzstani football club based in Jalal-Abad, Kyrgyzstan that played in the top division in Kyrgyzstan, the Kyrgyzstan League.

History 
2007: Founded as FC Lokomotiv Dzhalal-Abad.
2008: Dissolved.

Achievements 
Kyrgyzstan League:
4th place: 2007

Kyrgyzstan Cup:
finalist: 2007

External links 
Career stats by KLISF
Profile at Weltfussballarchiv 
Profile at Footballdatabase
Profile at Footballfacts

Football clubs in Kyrgyzstan
2007 establishments in Kyrgyzstan